K C Patel (b 1949) is a member of the Bharatiya Janata Party in India, and has been elected from the Valsad (Lok Sabha constituency), in Gujarat, in the 2014 Indian general elections and 2019 Indian general elections. However later it was found out that it was case Honey trapping and woman arrested for the same.

Controversy 
A women has accused him in alleged rape incident and filed an FIR against him. She also said about him that MP has threatened her of dire consequences and asked her to keep her mouth shut or else she would be killed.

References

Living people
India MPs 2014–2019
Lok Sabha members from Gujarat
People from Valsad district
Bharatiya Janata Party politicians from Gujarat
Place of birth missing (living people)
1950 births
India MPs 2019–present